The Fitzgerald Pioneers were a minor league baseball team, based in Fitzgerald, Georgia that played from 1948 until 1957. The team played in the Class D level Georgia State League and won the league's title in 1948.

Baseball Hall of Fame member Earl Weaver was the player/manager for Fitzgerald in 1957

History
In 1953, the team joined the Georgia–Florida League and became an affiliate of the Cincinnati Redlegs. The following year the team name changed to the Fitzgerald Redlegs, to match their affiliate. In 1956 the team became and affiliate of the Kansas City Athletics and was renamed the Fitzgerald Athletics. Finally in 1957, the team became affiliated with Baltimore Orioles and were renamed the Fitzgerald Orioles and were managed by player/manager Earl Weaver, who was inducted into the Baseball Hall of Fame in 1996.

On July 19, 1952, at Pilots Field against the Statesboro Pilots, Joe Reliford of the visiting Fitzgerald Pioneers, age 12, became the youngest person to play in a professional baseball game. Reliford simultaneously broke the racial barrier for the segregated Georgia State League. A photo of Reliford in uniform is housed in the Baseball Hall of Fame Library in Cooperstown, NY. 

During the game, Reliford, playing outfield for one inning, made a catch over the wall, robbing Pilot player Jim Shuster of a home run to end the game. He was congratulated by Pilot fans, who came on the field and cheered him.

The ballpark
Fitzgerald played home games at Blue & Grey Park. The ballpark was located at 301 East Palm Street, Fitzgerald, Georgia 31750.

Notable alumni

Baseball Hall of Fame alumni
Earl Weaver (1957) Inducted, 1996

Notable alumni
 Ace Adams (1952) MLB All-Star
 Joe Reliford (1952) Youngest professional and broke league color barrier

References

External link
 Baseball Reference – Fitzgerald, Georgia

Baseball teams established in 1948
Baseball teams disestablished in 1953
Defunct Georgia-Florida League teams
Defunct Georgia State League teams
Professional baseball teams in Georgia (U.S. state)
Baltimore Orioles minor league affiliates
Cincinnati Reds minor league affiliates
Kansas City Athletics minor league affiliates
1948 establishments in Georgia (U.S. state)
1957 disestablishments in Georgia (U.S. state)
Ben Hill County, Georgia
Defunct baseball teams in Georgia